Catch! Teenieping is a South Korean computer-animated television series produced by SAMG Entertainment. The first season of the series aired on KBS2 on March 19, 2020. The second season is currently airing since September 22, 2021 under the title Twinkle Catch! Teenieping on JEI TV.

Plot
The series revolves around Romi, a pretty normal girl at first glance, who is actually the princess of a magic kingdom, the Emotion Kingdom. She came to Earth to catch all the Teeniepings: cute but very mischievous creatures that all have a unique power attached to an emotion or a concept they represent. They like to wreak havoc in all Harmony Town, and try everything to not be caught. To catch them, Romi has to transform into a magical princess with the help of some Teeniepings. However, she must be really careful to keep her identity secret, as the people of Harmony Village do not believe in magic.

Characters

Main
 Romi is the princess of the Emotion Kingdom, who became a normal girl of Harmony Town. When a freed Teenieping is around, she secretly transforms into a magical princess to catch them.
 Ian is a young man who desires to be a pastry chef, following his father's footsteps.
 Kyle is the son of a famous and wealthy conglomerate who wishes to become a pastry chef.
 Jun is a handsome young man who aims to own his own bakery one day.

Teeniepings
 Heartsping is the Teenieping of love, who always stays with Romi. She is nice, full of love and care for friends.
 Dadaping is the Teenieping of rightness. He is very serious and organized. He is always looking to learn new things.
 Gogoping is the Teenieping of courage. He is very sporty and likes challenges, as well as crazy activities.
 Chachaping is the Teenieping of hope. Calm and relaxed, she is very optimistic and never loses hope when there are difficulties.
 Lalaping is the Teenieping of joy. She is very cheerful and energic, and likes to sing and dance with her friends.
 Happying is the Teenieping of happiness. The last Royal Teenieping, she appears to be nowhere to be found, until Romi discovers she was actually transformed into Giggleping, a villain Teenieping.
 Joahping is the Teenieping of kindness. Warm, gentle, and sensitive. She likes to help others.
 Teeheeping is the Teenieping of laugh. A real tomboy, she likes to have fun with her friends.
 Trustping is the Teenieping of truth. The youngest of all, he is faithful and innocent. They are cute.

Episodes

Season 1 (2020-2021)

Season 2: Twinkle Catch! Teenieping (2021-2022)

Season 3: Secret Catch! Teenieping (2022-TBA)

Broadcast
Catch! Teenieping premiered on KBS2 in South Korea on March 19, 2020. The series is also released on VODs and video platforms. The first season aired on KBS2 every Thursday at 5:15 pm until April 1, 2021. The season 2 of the series was broadcast from September 22, 2021, on JEI TV every Wednesday first at 8:30 am. The same episode would be rebroadcast at 6:30 pm. To celebrate the second season, JEI TV held a poll in October 2021 to encourage viewers to pick their favorite characters.

On July 12, 2021, it was first broadcast in China under the title 奇妙萌可 on Chinese Streaming platforms. The Season 1 of the series was premiered on Netflix on October 30, 2021. It ranked No. 5 in Australia and No. 9 in North America on Netflix’s trending kids’ content list. It will be aired in Japan on Kids Station on December 3, 2022.

Music

Opening songs
Season 1: "CATCH PING : Fairies of Emotion opening song", performed by Kim Yurim.
Season 2: "Sparkling Catch! Teenieping title", performed by Lee Jeongeun.

Insert songs 
CATCH PING : Kid's dance song
 "Teenieping song", Lee Jeongeun, 2:25
 "Heartsping song", Cho Gyeongi, 1:45
 "Princess Romi song", Jang Yena, 2:04.
Others
 "Hi", Jang Yena, 1:34.

References

External links
Catch! Teenieping: Fairies of Emotion at SAMG Entertainment
 Twinkle Catch! Teenieping at SAMG Entertainment
Catch! Teenieping: Fairies of Emotion at KBS website 
Sparkling Catch! Teenieping at JEI TV's website

2020s South Korean television series
South Korean children's animated fantasy television series
Computer-animated television series
Korean-language television shows
Magical girl television series
ja:キャッチ!ティニピン